Sceloporus grammicus is a species of lizard from Mexico and the southern United States. It is sometimes referred to as the mesquite lizard or graphic spiny lizard.

Geographic range
Sceloporus grammicus is native to the southern United States in the state of Texas, and to Mexico in the states of Chihuahua, Durango, Zacatecas, Coahuila, San Luis Potosí, Nuevo León, Tamaulipas, Oaxaca, Guerrero, Querétaro, and Aguascalientes.

Description

Sceloporus grammicus is a flat-bodied lizard with a tail that is slightly longer than head-body length. The dorsum is mottled olive or gray and has a pattern consisting of 3–6 dark crossbars. The forelegs and tail have narrow crossbars. Males differ from females by having blue patches and black mottling on throat, a dark line on each shoulder, and blue patches on sides of belly, sometimes bordered in black.

Reproduction
Sceloporus grammicus is viviparous. Litter size varies between 2 and 12.

Subspecies 
There are four recognized subspecies of Sceloporus grammicus including the nominate race:
Sceloporus grammicus disparilis Stejneger, 1916 — mesquite graphic lizard
Sceloporus grammicus grammicus Wiegmann, 1828 — southern mesquite lizard
Sceloporus grammicus microlepidotus Wiegmann, 1834 — northern mesquite lizard
Sceloporus grammicus tamaulipensis Sites & Dixon, 1981 — Tamaulipas mesquite lizard

References

Further reading
 Wiegmann, A.F.A. 1828. Beyträge zur Amphibienkunde. Isis (Oken) 21(4):364-383.
 Wiegmann, A.F.A. 1834. Herpetologia Mexicana, seu descriptio amphibiorum novae hispaniae, quae itineribus comitis de Sack, Ferdinandi Deppe et Chr. Guil. Schiede in Museum Zoologicum Berolinense Pervenerunt. Pars prima, saurorum species. Berlin, Lüderitz, iv + 54 pp.
 Stejneger, L.H. 1916. A new lizard in the genus Sceloporus from Texas. Proc. Biol. Soc. Wash. 29:227-230.
 Sites, J.W. and Dixon, J.R. 1981. A new subspecies of the Iguanid lizard, Sceloporus grammicus, from Northeastern Mexico, with comments on its evolutionary implications and the status of S. g. disparilis. Journal of Herpetology 15(1):59-69.

Sceloporus
Reptiles of Mexico
Reptiles of the United States
Fauna of the Rio Grande valleys
Taxa named by Arend Friedrich August Wiegmann
Reptiles described in 1828